Arbors Records is a record company and independent record label in Clearwater, Florida. It was founded by Mat and Rachel Domber in 1989 and was initially devoted to the recordings of their friend, Rick Fay.

Arbors became known in the 1990s for swing music and Dixieland jazz, though its catalogue encompasses other forms of contemporary and classic jazz. Its roster includes Dan Barrett, Ruby Braff, Bob Wilber, Dave Frishberg, and Bucky Pizzarelli.

Roster

Joe Ascione
Ehud Asherie
Dan Barrett
Ruby Braff
James Chirillo
Evan Christopher
Joe Cohn
Kenny Davern
Peter Ecklund
Rick Fay
Chris Flory
Johnny Frigo
Dave Frishberg
Wycliffe Gordon
Marty Grosz
Bob Haggart
Jake Hanna
Chuck Hedges
Joel Helleny
Skitch Henderson
Eddie Higgins
Maurice Hines
Dick Hyman
Jane Jarvis
Jon-Erik Kellso
Rebecca Kilgore
Walt Levinsky
George Masso
Louis Mazetier
Michael Moore
Tommy Newsom
Ken Peplowski
Bucky Pizzarelli
Herb Pomeroy
Scott Robinson
John Sheridan
Carol Sloane
Derek Smith
Statesmen of Jazz
Ralph Sutton
Ross Tompkins
Warren Vaché Jr.
Johnny Varro
George Wein
Aaron Weinstein
Bob Wilber

References 

1989 establishments in Florida
American record labels
Companies based in Clearwater, Florida
Jazz record labels
Record labels established in 1989